Abdullah Salem Al-Khalidi (born 1 March 1958) is an Omani sprinter. He competed in the men's 100 metres at the 1988 Summer Olympics.

References

External links
 

1958 births
Living people
Athletes (track and field) at the 1988 Summer Olympics
Athletes (track and field) at the 1992 Summer Olympics
Omani male sprinters
Olympic athletes of Oman
Place of birth missing (living people)